The Cathedral of Our Lady of Guadalupe is the main Roman Catholic church building of Canelones, Uruguay. It is the see of the Roman Catholic Diocese of Canelones since 1961.

History
The first temple was built in 1775; around the small church, a township evolved. In 1828, the priest Juan Francisco Larrobla blessed here the first Flag of Uruguay.

The current building was completed in 1843, and it was expanded later. Since 1900 it has a mechanical organ. It is dedicated to the Virgin of Guadalupe, which was also the original denomination of the city, Villa Nuestra Señora de Guadalupe.

In 1945, Cardinal Antonio Barbieri elevated the church to National Sanctuary of the Virgin of Guadalupe.

See also
 List of Roman Catholic cathedrals in Uruguay
 Roman Catholic Diocese of Canelones

Bibliography
  Juan José Villegas Mañé. Historia de la parroquia Nuestra Señora de Guadalupe de Canelones, 1775-1977, en La Iglesia en el Uruguay. Estudios históricos, Cuadernos del ITU, Nº 4, Instituto Teológico del Uruguay, Montevideo, 1978.

References

External links
 
 Diocese of Canelones

Canelones, Uruguay
Roman Catholic church buildings in Canelones Department
Roman Catholic cathedrals in Uruguay
Roman Catholic churches completed in 1843
1843 establishments in Uruguay
19th-century Roman Catholic church buildings in Uruguay